Maksim Vladimirovich Primak (born 26 October 1981) is a Russian former professional footballer.

Club career
He made his debut in the Russian Premier League in 2002 for FC Uralan Elista.

References

1981 births
Living people
Russian footballers
FC Energiya Volzhsky players
FC Elista players
FC Irtysh Pavlodar players
Russian Premier League players
Russian expatriate footballers
Expatriate footballers in Kazakhstan
Russian expatriate sportspeople in Kazakhstan
FC Volgar Astrakhan players
FC Rotor Volgograd players
FC Armavir players
Association football midfielders